Sunbury railway station is the terminus of the suburban electrified Sunbury line in Victoria, Australia. It serves the north-western Melbourne suburb of Sunbury, and opened on 10 February 1859.

The station is also serviced by V/Line services to Bendigo and Echuca.

Disused station Rupertswood is located between Sunbury and Clarkefield.

History
Sunbury station opened on 10 February 1859 as a terminus, with the railway line not extended further for two years. The three-track yard dates from that time, and was unique in Victoria. There was a large goods shed on its southern side, a large silo on its northern side, as well as sheep and cattle ramp and yards. There was also housing for railway staff, including two houses in Horne Street, and the stationmaster's house in Brook Street, which were all demolished in the 1980s.

Until 1981, proper interlocking of the signals and point work did not exist, and the station was not fully interlocked until 1998, when Solid State Interlocking was provided. On 16 April 2005, that interlocking was abolished, as part of the Regional Fast Rail project.

In late 1993, the station was refurbished, with upgrades included an enclosed booking lobby, an air-conditioned waiting room, repainted station buildings and landscaping of the garden area around the station. In 2005, as part of the Regional Fast Rail project, the layout of the station was again altered.

On 18 November 2012, the station was added to the metropolitan network, when the line from Watergardens was electrified. The station was also upgraded as part of those works. Electrification of the line to Sunbury was first proposed in the 1970s, along with a new station along the Sunbury bank north of the Jackson Creek bridge, to serve the Goonawarra housing estate. However, after a drop in population estimates, that idea was abandoned.

In 1940, flashing-light warning signals were provided at the former Gap Road level crossing, which was located at the up end of the station, with boom barriers provided in 1983. In 2005, the level crossing was modified as part of the Regional Fast Rail project and, in 2012, was modified again, as part of the electrification of the line to Sunbury. On 30 November 2018, the Level Crossing Removal Project announced that the level crossing would be grade separated, with the road passing underneath the railway line. The project was brought forward from 2025, and was completed in September 2022.

Platforms and services
Sunbury has two side platforms. It is served by Sunbury line trains, as well as V/Line Bendigo and Echuca line services.

Platform 1:
  all stations and limited express services to Flinders Street; terminating services
  V/Line services to Southern Cross, Bendigo, Eaglehawk and Epsom
  V/Line services to Southern Cross and Echuca

Platform 2:
 terminating services; all stations and limited express services to Flinders Street
 V/Line services to Bendigo, Eaglehawk, Epsom and Southern Cross
 V/Line services to Echuca and Southern Cross

By late 2025, it is planned that trains on the Sunbury line will be through-routed with those on the Pakenham and Cranbourne lines, via the new Metro Tunnel.

Transport links
CDC Melbourne operates one route to and from Sunbury station, under contract to Public Transport Victoria:
 : to Westfield Airport West

Dysons operates one route to and from Sunbury station, under contract to Public Transport Victoria:
 to Lancefield

Sunbury Bus Service operates seven routes to and from Sunbury station, under contract to Public Transport Victoria:
 : to Mount Lion
 : to Moonee Ponds Junction
 : to Wilsons Lane
 : to Rolling Meadows
 : to Killara Heights
 : to Jacksons Hill
 : to Canterbury Hills

Gallery

References

External links
 
 Rail Geelong gallery
 Melway map at street-directory.com.au

Premium Melbourne railway stations
Railway stations in Melbourne
Railway stations in Australia opened in 1859
Sunbury, Victoria
Railway stations in the City of Hume